Zuiderdijk may refer to:

 , a cargo ship that served in the United States Navy from 1918 to 1919.

Ship names